Tweebuffelsmeteenskootmorsdoodgeskietfontein is a farm in the North West province of South Africa, located about 200 km west of Pretoria and 20 km east of Lichtenburg whose 44-character name has entered South African folklore. It is the longest place name in South Africa, and one of the longest anywhere in the world.

The name, which follows a common format for Afrikaans-language place names in South Africa, means "the spring where two buffaloes were shot stone-dead with one shot". The literal translation is "Twee buffels" = "Two buffaloes", "met een skoot" = "with one shot"; "" = "stone dead"; "" = "shot"; "" = "spring (river source)" or "fountain". This name illustrates the compounding nature of Germanic languages including Afrikaans, itself derived from Dutch. All the descriptive terms relating to one concept can generally be tied together into one long word. Another example of this would be , which translates to "watermelon peel jam competition judge's manual". Such use is, however, not common, and such words are often separated using one or more hyphens if they become too long or unwieldy.

The farm was originally granted to A.P. de Nysschen in 1866 by the government of the South African Republic; it is referred to in the survey diagram as "" (Two buffaloes shot) and shown as having an area of 6119 morgen and 429 square roods (5241.7 hectares). Official maps published by National Geo-spatial Information refer to it as "" (Two buffaloes).
 

See also 
 Afrikaans grammar
 Compound (linguistics)
 Longest word in Afrikaans
 List of long place names

References

Further reading

External links
 

Farms in South Africa
Economy of North West (South African province)